Prince Chinenye Ibeh (born June 3, 1994) is a British-Rwandan professional basketball player for Guaros de Lara of the SPB.

College career
Ibeh played college basketball at Texas from 2012 to 2016. Ibeh scored 17 points, grabbed 10 rebounds and blocked five shots in a 71-54 win over TCU on January 26, 2016. As a senior, he stepped into a bigger role due to an injury to Cameron Ridley. He averaged 4.1 points, 5.0 rebounds, and 2.0 blocks per game, shooting 57.8 percent. He was named the 2016 Big 12 Defensive Player of the Year and was selected to the Big 12 All-Defensive Team.

Professional career

Long Island Nets (2017–2018)
The Long Island Nets, the NBA Development League affiliate of the Brooklyn Nets, signed Ibeh in February 2017. In his second game with the Nets, Ibeh recorded 3 points and 6 rebounds in almost 15 minutes of playing time against the Raptors 905.

Yokohama (2018–2019)
After his tenure with the Long Island Nets, Ibeh signed with the Yokohama B-Corsairs of the B.League. On January 5, 2019, Ibeh recorded his first career double-double after recording 12 points and 10 rebounds in a 106-99 win over the Nagoya Diamond Dolphins. In 18 games played with Yokohama, he averaged 4.7 points, 7.8 rebounds and 2.8 blocks.

NorthPort Batang Pier (2019)
For the 2019 Commissioners' Cup, the NorthPort Batang Pier tapped Ibeh as their import. In his PBA debut, Ibeh recorded 19 points, 13 rebounds and 3 steals in a 103-81 win over the Alaska Aces. Three days later, Ibeh recorded 15 points, 19 rebounds and 6 blocks in a 83-79 win over the import-less NLEX Road Warriors. Despite of his stellar performance, Ibeh was criticized for his woeful free throw shooting as he shot 1-for-12 from the free throw line in that win. He recorded 18 points, 20 rebounds and 3 blocks in a 110-86 win over the TNT Katropa.

Hamburg Towers (2019–2020)
On July 30, 2019, Ibeh signed with the Hamburg Towers of the Basketball Bundesliga. In 15 games, he averaged 5.9 points, 4.1 rebounds, and 1.7 blocks per game.

Plymouth Raiders (2020–2021)
On October 26, 2020, Ibeh signed with the Plymouth Raiders of the British Basketball League. In April 2021, Ibeh left the team.

Patriots (2021)
In May 2021, Ibeh joined the Rwandan team Patriots BBC to play in the 2021 BAL season. In six games, he averaged 7.8 points, 5.7 rebounds, 1.3 assists, and 1.2 blocks per game.

Club Atlético Aguada (2021)
On September 3, 2021, Ibeh signed with Club Atlético Aguada of the Liga Uruguaya de Básquetbol.

New Taipei CTBC DEA (2021–2022)
On October 14, 2021, Ibeh signed with New Taipei CTBC DEA of the T1 League.

Trouville (2022)
On March 15, 2022, Ibeh signed with Club Trouville of the Liga Uruguaya de Básquetbol.

Second stint with NorthPort Batang Pier (2022)
In August 2022, Ibeh signed again with the NorthPort Batang Pier of the Philippine Basketball Association (PBA) as the team's import for the 2022–23 PBA Commissioner's Cup.

TaiwanBeer HeroBears (2022–2023)
On December 14, 2022, Ibeh signed with TaiwanBeer HeroBears of the T1 League. On March 6, 2023, the team terminated the Ibeh's contract.

Guaros de Lara (2023–present) 
On March 17, 2023, Guaros de Lara from Venezuela announced they had acquired Ibeh.

National team career
In February 2021, Ibeh was added to the roster of the Rwandan national basketball team. He played in two games for the AfroBasket 2021 qualifiers and averaged 11 points.

Career statistics

Domestic leagues

|-
| align=center | 2016–17
| align=left rowspan=2| Long Island Nets 
| align=left rowspan=2|NBA G League
| 10 || 9.7 || .211 || .000 || .600 || 2.0 || .1 || .1 || .9 || 1.1
|-
| align=center | 2017–18
| 32 || 11.0 || .571 || .000 || .216 || 2.9 || .2 || .3 || 1.4 || 15.9
|-
| align=center | 2018–19
| align=left | Yokohama B-Corsairs
| align=left | B.League
| 18 || 26.3 || .432 || .000 || .167 || 7.8 || .6 || .9 || 2.8 || 4.8
|-
| align=center | 2018–19
| align=left | NorthPort Batang Pier
| align=left | PBA
| 13 || 37.9 || .625 || .000 || .274 || 15.9 || 1.2 || 1.3 || 4.0 || 13.7
|-
| align=center | 2019–20
| align=left | Hamburg Towers
| align=left | Bundesliga
| 15 || 17.9 || .661 || .000 || .294 || 4.1 || .5 || .1 || 1.7 || 5.9
|-
| align=center | 2020–21
| align=left | Plymouth Raiders
| align=left | BBL
| 17 || 21.1 || .532 || .000 || .366 || 7.0 || .6 || .2 || 1.8 || 6.8
|-
|-class=sortbottom
| align="center" colspan=3 | Career
| 105 || 19.4 || .545 || .000 || .277 || 6.1 || .5 || .5 || 2.0 || 5.5

BAL statistics

|-
|style="text-align:left;"|2021
|style="text-align:left;"|Patriots
| 6 || 4 || 20.2 || .538 || – || .263 || 5.7 || 1.3 || .3 || 1.3 || 7.8
|- class="sortbottom"
| style="text-align:center;" colspan="2"|Career
| 6 || 4 || 20.2 || .538 || – || .263 || 5.7 || 1.3 || .3 || 1.3 || 7.8

Personal life
His middle name, Chinenye, means "God's Gift" in Nigerian. His parents were both from Nigeria.

References

External links
 EuroBasket Profile
 RealGM Profile

1994 births
Living people
Patriots BBC players
British expatriate basketball people in Germany
Rwandan people of Nigerian descent
British expatriate basketball people in the Philippines
British expatriate basketball people in the United States
British men's basketball players
Basketball players from Greater London
Basketball players from Texas
Centers (basketball)
Hamburg Towers players
Rwandan men's basketball players
Long Island Nets players
NorthPort Batang Pier players
Philippine Basketball Association imports
Power forwards (basketball)
Texas Longhorns men's basketball players
British expatriate basketball people in Taiwan
New Taipei CTBC DEA players
T1 League imports
British expatriate basketball people in Uruguay
English sportspeople of Nigerian descent
British expatriate basketball people in Japan
Yokohama B-Corsairs players
Club Atlético Aguada players
Plymouth Raiders players
TaiwanBeer HeroBears players
English people of Rwandan descent
Guaros de Lara (basketball) players